Marc Carol Ybarra (born 14 February 1985) is a Spanish auto racing driver.

Career
Carol competed in the Formula BMW Junior Cup Iberia in 2001, where he finished fourth. He also won the Spanish Citroën Saxo Cup that year. In 2002 he finished fifth in the Spanish Formula Junior 1600 series.

Carol won the Spanish SEAT León Supercopa in 2004, and he was rewarded with a one-off drive for SEAT Sport in the 2005 World Touring Car Championship at the Race of Spain at Circuit Ricardo Tormo. He finished the first race tenth, and the second race in eighth, scoring one championship point.

Carol returned to the Supercopa in 2007, finishing thirteenth. He also competed in the Spanish GT Championship in 2007 and 2008. Carol also won the Spanish Endurance Championship in 2008. He currently leads the SEAT León Supercopa in 2009.

Racing record

Complete World Touring Car Championship results
(key) (Races in bold indicate pole position) (Races in italics indicate fastest lap)

Notes

References

External links

1985 births
Living people
Spanish racing drivers
World Touring Car Championship drivers
Cupra Racing drivers